The Hammer of Thor is a board game for 2–362 players published by Nova Game Designs (originally Gameshop) in 1980.

Gameplay
The Hammer of Thor is a game in which the object is to be victorious at Ragnarok, the final battle between the Norse gods and the giants. Players spend the game in wilderness adventures, gathering and strengthening their forces and burnishing their reputation.

Components
 17" x 22" map board printed on glossy paper
 120 counters
 explanation of abilities card
 random encounter chart
 4 character sheets
 a 20-sided die
 677 cards printed on cardstock
 rule book

Victory conditions
At the final battle of Ragnarok, one side, Good or Evil, will triumph. The player on the winning side with the highest reputation wins the game.

Publication history
The game was designed by Joe Angiolillo and published by Gameshop in 1980. Gameshop then changed their name to Nova Game Designs, and published a second edition that added leader action cards to the components.

Reception
In the October 1980 edition of Military Modelling (Vol. 10, No. 10), Charles Vasey called the game "very impressive" and also noted that despite "very considerable research", that the game was "not difficult to play." He concluded, "One is staggered by such design work."

In the May 1981 edition of Dragon (Issue #49), Bill Fawcett thought that the game "ought to be a good, if not a great game [...] But the game isn't nearly as much fun to play as it should be."  He blamed this in part on the number of components, specifically over 600 cards, and he also found the production values were poor. He noted the small map board "quickly becomes cramped and verges on being unplayable when four or more players are involved." And despite complex but understandable rules and several good concepts, Fawcett found that "The game itself, however, is almost overwhelmed by all of the 'chrome' built into the rules. The individual parts and concepts are good, but the framework of the game doesn’t always lend itself to the easy application of all the details." He concluded, "If you are deeply interested, or even casually interested, in Norse mythology, you’ll appreciate and enjoy the game, despite its technical drawbacks. If you’re looking for a fast-moving, multi-player game, this might not be a good choice; it takes quite a bit of effort on the players’ parts to get the game 'off the ground' and rolling smoothly." 

In the September 1981 edition of The Space Gamer (Issue No. 43), W.G. Armintrout thought the game more amateur than professional, saying, "Hammer of Thor was a labor of love on the part of the designer. Too bad Nova didn't assign him as a developer. The game is not playable as published, nor are any simple fixes going to help – I recommend Hammer only to Norse mythology freaks who want to rewrite major sections of the rulebook."

In Issue 32 of Phoenix (July–August 1981), John Lambshead noted the high cost of the game, but was not impressed by the components, calling the artwork of the cards "uniformly uninspiring," and noting that some of the cards were of uneven size, and the log sheet was a cheap photocopy. Lambshead was not sure whether The Hammer of Thor was designed as a board game with element of role-playing, or a role-playing game played on a board, and found little help in the unindexed rules. He also noted that because only one player at a time is active, everyone else has to sit and wait. "It gets very boring for the uninvolved players awaiting their turn." He concluded, "I cannot see this game being of general interest although it is the sort of thing that may well come to have a small but enthusiastic following."

Other recognition
A copy of The Hammer of Thor: The Game of Norse Mythology is held in the collection of the Strong National Museum of Play (object 112.6518).

References

Board games introduced in 1980
Nova Game Designs games